is a Japanese footballer who plays for Renofa Yamaguchi FC.

Club career
He's the younger brother of Yoshiaki and Toshiyuki Takagi, who both grew up in Tokyo Verdy youth ranks. After several years in the youth ranks, he signed a full pro contract for Tokyo Verdy in April 2013.

National team career
In June 2011, Takagi was elected Japan U-17 national team for 2011 U-17 World Cup. He played 2 matches and scored a goal against Argentina.

Club statistics
Updated to end of 2018 season.

References

External links
Profile at Renofa Yamaguchi

Profile at Tokyo Verdy

1995 births
Living people
Association football people from Kanagawa Prefecture
Japanese footballers
J1 League players
J2 League players
Tokyo Verdy players
Renofa Yamaguchi FC players
Gamba Osaka U-23 players
Gamba Osaka players
Association football forwards